Mimi's Bistro + Bakery  (formerly Mimi's Café) is an American restaurant chain with 46 locations in 12 states. Originally headquartered in Tustin, California, its headquarters moved to Dallas, Texas in 2014 after 36 years in California. It serves French and American food, with French rustic decor and themes.

Arthur J. Simms (who headed the commissary at MGM Studios in the 1950s), his son Thomas Simms, Brian Taylor, and Paul Kurz opened the first Mimi's Cafe in December 1978 in Anaheim, California. Bob Evans Farms, Inc. purchased the Mimi's Cafe restaurant chain (operating under SWH Corporation) in July 2004 for USD$182 million. Mimi's Cafe was sold to the U.S. branch of Groupe Le Duff, which also owns the La Madeleine restaurants, in February 2013.

History 
Mimi's Bistro + Bakery is a wholly owned subsidiary of LeDuff America and was founded as Mimi's Cafe by American airman Arthur Simms, who was stationed in France during World War II. He named the restaurant after a French woman he met in a party after the liberation of the country.  In July 2019, the company re-branded as Mimi's Bistro + Bakery in order to "reflect the company’s desire to make Mimi’s a destination restaurant, where diners can sit down for a leisurely experience over food and affordable wine."

References

External links
Mimi's Cafe website

Restaurant chains in the United States
French restaurants in the United States
Companies based in Irvine, California
Food and drink companies based in California
1978 establishments in California